Sege River (Swedish: Sege å) is a river in Sweden.

References

Rivers of Skåne County